The historic Rock River Hotel, later the Blackhawk Hotel and currently known as the Patchwork Inn bed and breakfast, is a two-story I-house brick building in the Ogle County, Illinois city of Oregon. The Hotel is within the Oregon Commercial Historic District. The district and its contributing properties were added to the National Register of Historic Places in August 2006. Today it operates as a bed and breakfast but in its earliest years it was a private residence, by 1899 it had been converted for use as a hotel.

Notes

Houses completed in 1860
Defunct hotels in Illinois
Buildings and structures in Oregon Commercial Historic District
I-houses in Illinois
Historic district contributing properties in Illinois
Hotel buildings on the National Register of Historic Places in Illinois